Liotella kilcundae is a species of minute sea snail, a marine gastropod mollusc in the family Skeneidae.

Description
The height of the shell attains 0.25mm, its diameter 1.25 mm. The very minute, white, hyaline shell consists of four whorls, including the smooth, globular protoconch. It has a discoidal shape with a sunken spire and is widely umbilicated. It is ornamented with transverse riblets. On the body whorl they number about 27. They are irregularly spaced, becoming more crowded towards the aperture. The intervening spaces are traversed by very fine, encircling incised lines. The aperture is circular.

Distribution
This marine species is endemic to Australia and occurs off New South Wales and Victoria.

References

 Iredale, T. & McMichael, D.F. (1962). A reference list of the marine Mollusca of New South Wales. Memoirs of the Australian Museum. 11 : 1-109

External links
 Natural History Museum Rotterdam: Liotella kilcundae
 Seashells of New South Wales: Liotella kilcundae

kilcundae
Gastropods of Australia
Gastropods described in 1914